Masciago may refer to:

 Bovisio-Masciago, municipality in the Province of Monza and Brianza in the Italian region Lombardy
 Masciago Primo, municipality in the Province of Varese in the Italian region Lombardy
 Masciago Milanese, frazioni of Bovisio Masciago